Thomas "Tom" Burke Baldwin (May 13, 1961 – May 2, 2000) was an American football defensive lineman in the National Football League. He was selected by the New York Jets in the 9th round (234th overall pick) of the 1984 NFL Draft out of Tulsa. He played four seasons for the New York Jets.

References

1961 births
2000 deaths
People from Evergreen Park, Illinois
Players of American football from Illinois
American football defensive linemen
Wisconsin Badgers football players
Tulsa Golden Hurricane football players
New York Jets players
Ed Block Courage Award recipients